An election to Cambridgeshire County Council took place on 3 May 2001 as part of the 2001 United Kingdom local elections. The previous election was the 1997 Cambridgeshire County Council election. All 59 councillors were elected from electoral divisions, which returned either one or two county councillors each by first-past-the-post voting. New electoral division boundaries were brought in for the next elections, increasing the number of seats to 69 at the 2005 Cambridgeshire County Council election.

Results

|}

Results by electoral division

Cambridge (14 seats)

Fenland (9 seats)

References

Cambridgeshire County Council elections
2001 English local elections
2000s in Cambridgeshire